Panjumittai is a 2018 Tamil language fantasy comedy film written and directed by debutant S. P. Mohan (also known as Sengoda mohan) and produced by Ramesh KV, S. Ganesh and Vinodh Kumar. The film has Ma Ka Pa Anand and Nikhila Vimal in the lead roles, while Sendrayan, Pandiarajan, Pandu and Vidyullekha Raman play supporting roles. D. Imman composed the music for the film, which was based on the short film Kalaru.

Plot 
Appu, a married man, begins to suspect his close friend Kuppu having an affair with his wife Ranji, as he finds both of them sharing similar interests.

Cast 
Ma Ka Pa Anand as Appu
Nikhila Vimal as Ranji
Sendrayan as Kuppu
Pandiarajan as Psychiatrist 
Pandu 
Vidyullekha Raman
Bharathimani
Thavasi as Ranji's father

Soundtrack
The soundtrack was composed by D. Imman.

Release and reception 
Panjumittai was released on 1 June 2018. The Times of India rated the film 1.5 out of 5 stars. The Indian Express rated it 3 stars out of 5, writing, "Panjumittai is a throwback to the wonderful, sweet escape a cinema hall offered in the past, but in its existing problematic form, also turns out to be a stark reminder of how artificiality can leave a bitter aftertaste."

References

External links 

2018 films
2010s Tamil-language films
Features based on short films
Films scored by D. Imman
Indian science fiction comedy films
2010s science fiction comedy films
Indian fantasy comedy films
2010s fantasy comedy films
2018 directorial debut films
2018 comedy films